Hinesville is a city in Liberty County, Georgia, United States, located on the Atlantic coastal plain. The population was 33,437 at the 2010 census and an estimated 33,273 in 2019. The city is the county seat of Liberty County. It is the principal city of the Hinesville metropolitan area, which comprises all of Liberty County, including the Fort Stewart army installation, plus neighboring Long County.

History
Hinesville was founded in 1837. That same year, the seat of Liberty County was transferred to Hinesville from Riceboro. It was incorporated as a city in 1916. The city is named for Charleton Hines, a state senator.

A 2017 report by Business Insider listed Hinesville as the most boring city in Georgia, noting that there were only 25 full-service restaurants, four bars, 13 hotels, and no museums in the Hinesville metropolitan area.

Geography
Hinesville is located west of the center of Liberty County, on the south side of Fort Stewart, the largest U.S. Army installation by area in the eastern United States. The city is bordered to the east by Flemington and to the south by Allenhurst and Walthourville. To the southwest the city limits extend to the Long County line.

U.S. Route 84 passes through the city, leading east  to Interstate 95 near Midway and southwest  to U.S. Route 301 at Ludowici. Hinesville is the second largest city on US 84 in Georgia after Valdosta.

Most of Hinesville drains east via Peacock Creek to the tidal North Newport River, while the west side of the city drains north via Mill Creek, part of the Canoochee River watershed flowing east to the tidal Ogeechee River.

Demographics

2020 census

As of the 2020 United States census, there were 34,891 people, 13,332 households, and 9,354 families residing in the city.

2010 census
As of the 2010 United States Census, there were 33,437 people living in the city. The racial makeup of the city was 45.8% Black, 35.0% White, 0.4% Native American, 2.5% Asian, 0.7% Pacific Islander, 0.2% from some other race and 3.9% from two or more races. 11.5% were Hispanic or Latino of any race.

2000 census
As of the census of 2000, there were 30,392 people, 10,528 households, and 8,032 families living in the city. The racial makeup of the city was 46.04% African American, 41.50% White, 0.47% Native American, 2.26% Asian, 0.57% Pacific Islander, 5.00% from other races, and 4.16% from two or more races. Hispanic or Latino of any race were 9.11% of the population.

There were 10,528 households, out of which 50.2% had children under the age of 18 living with them, 56.0% were married couples living together, 16.7% had a female householder with no husband present, and 23.7% were non-families. 17.4% of all households were made up of individuals, and 2.4% had someone living alone who was 65 years of age or older.  The average household size was 2.89 and the average family size was 3.26.

In the city, the population was spread out, with 34.2% under the age of 18, 13.8% from 18 to 24, 36.0% from 25 to 44, 12.9% from 45 to 64, and 3.1% who were 65 years of age or older.  The median age was 26 years. For every 100 females, there were 97.3 males.  For every 100 females age 18 and over, there were 95.3 males.

The median income for a household in the city was $35,013, and the median income for a family was $36,221. Males had a median income of $27,135 versus $20,813 for females. The per capita income for the city was $14,300.  About 13.8% of families and 14.8% of the population were below the poverty line, including 20.9% of those under age 18 and 12.3% of those age 65 or over.

Government and infrastructure
The U.S. Postal Service operates the Hinesville Post Office. The Liberty County Courthouse is in Hinesville and is listed on the National Register of Historic Places.

Education

The Liberty County School District, based in Hinesville, holds pre-school to 12th grade, and consists of seven elementary schools, three middle schools, and two high schools.  the district has 674 full-time teachers and over 11,274 students.  the superintendent is Dr. Valya S. Lee. Liberty County High School and Bradwell Institute are the comprehensive high schools serving the community.

Georgia Southern University's Liberty campus is in the community.

Live Oak Public Libraries operates the Hinesville Library.

Media

Newspaper 
 Coastal Courier

Gallery

Sister cities 
Hinesville is paired with the following cities:
  Yichun, China
  Marsabit, Kenya

References

External links

 Official website
 Hinesville Area Arts Council
 Liberty County Chamber of Commerce
 

 
County seats in Georgia (U.S. state)
Cities in Liberty County, Georgia
Cities in Georgia (U.S. state)
Populated places established in 1837